XHIY-FM is a radio station on 91.7 FM in Ríoverde, San Luis Potosí. It carries a pop format known as SPKtacular.

History
XEIY-AM 1290 received its concession on September 3, 1971. It was owned by María Gertrudiz Sánchez de Martínez and broadcast as a daytimer with 250 watts, later 1,000.

On April 7, 2006, XEIY was authorized to move to 650 kHz and increase power to 5 kW. In 2011, XEIY was approved for AM-FM migration as XHIY-FM 91.7.

References

Radio stations in San Luis Potosí